William Henry James Cookson (10 December 1900 – 19 July 1980) was an Australian rules footballer who played with Essendon in the Victorian Football League (VFL).

Notes

External links 
		

1900 births
1980 deaths
Australian rules footballers from Victoria (Australia)
Essendon Football Club players